Ozola microniaria is a moth of the family Geometridae first described by Francis Walker in 1862. It is found in Sri Lanka.

Host plants include Premna species.

References

Moths of Asia
Moths described in 1862